Amber Skye Noyes (born February 17, 1988) is an American actress and singer, known for her portrayal of Tori Windsor in The CW series Beauty & the Beast and Celine Fox in the third season of the ABC thriller Quantico.

Early life and career
Originally hailing from Warren Township, New Jersey Noyes attended Wyoming Seminary for high school, before going on to attend Emerson College and later graduating from New York University. In 2013, she made her acting debut in the online television drama series, One Life to Live. Following on from her first role, Noyes won other roles on a variety of TV shows including Beauty & the Beast, The Blacklist, Blindspot and The Deuce.

On December 6, 2017, Deadline Hollywood reported that Noyes was cast in a recurring role on the third season of the ABC thriller Quantico. She starred as FBI agent, Celine Fox.

Filmography

Television

References

External links
 

1987 births
Living people
Actresses from New Jersey
21st-century American actresses
American television actresses
Emerson College alumni
New York University alumni
People from Warren Township, New Jersey